The University of Oklahoma University College is the college that new students are part of until they have declared a major and are admitted another college.  Unlike the other colleges, the University College does not grant degrees.  The purpose of the University College is to aid in the transition to college and to hopefully prepare students for academic success.  

Since the University College was founded in 1942 it has been a model for programs for freshmen at other universities.

External links
 OU University College (The information in this article comes from this site)

University of Oklahoma
Educational institutions established in 1942
1942 establishments in Oklahoma